This is a list of bridges and viaducts in Madagascar, including those for pedestrians and vehicular traffic.

Historical and architectural interest bridges

Major road and railway bridges 
Kamoro, Mananjary and Betsiboka Bridges are three suspension bridges erected in Madagascar by the French company G. Leinekugel Le Cocq & Fils between 1931 and 1934.

This table presents the structures with spans greater than 100 meters (non-exhaustive list).

Notes and references 
 

 Others references

See also 

 Transport in Madagascar
 List of roads in Madagascar
 Rail transport in Madagascar
 Geography of Madagascar
 List of rivers of Madagascar

External links

Further reading 
 

Madagascar
 
Bridges
Bridges